Amy Kublin (born November 2, 1957) is a former competitive judoka for the United States.  She won four gold medals in the US National Judo Championships.

Career
Kublin was primarily trained by James Pedro Sr., but for a period was coached by Rusty Kanokogi.  She was considered to be a potential Olympian for the United States, but there was no Olympic Games for women in judo at the time.  She had a strong seinage throw and a strong ground game.

References

1957 births
Living people
American female judoka
21st-century American women
20th-century American women